The Instituto Mexicano de la Radio (English: "Mexican Radio Institute") is a Mexican public broadcaster, akin to National Public Radio in the US.  It is also known as IMER.

History
It was founded in 1983 as a companion to the public TV broadcaster Imevisión, since privatized and known as TV Azteca. When Imevisión was privatized, XEIMT-TV (Imevisión's cultural channel) and IMER remained under government control.

Current stations

Mexico City: XHIMER-FM, XHOF-FM, XHIMR-FM, XEDTL-AM, XEMP-AM, XEB-AM, XEQK-AM
Tijuana, Baja California: XHUAN-FM 
Cananea, Sonora: XHFQ-FM
Ciudad Acuña, Coahuila: XHRF-FM
Ciudad Juárez, Chihuahua: XHUAR-FM
Lázaro Cárdenas, Michoacán: XHLAC-FM
Salina Cruz, Oaxaca: XHSCO-FM
Comitán, Chiapas: XHEMIT-FM
Cacahoatán, Chiapas: XHCAH-FM
Chiapa de Corzo, Chiapas: XHCHZ-FM
Mérida, Yucatán: XHYUC-FM

Online: Radio México Internacional

External links
IMER web site

 
Mexican radio networks
1983 establishments in Mexico
Mass media companies established in 1983
Radio stations established in 1983